Elophila icciusalis, the pondside pyralid moth,  is a moth of the family Crambidae. It is found in most of North America.

The wingspan is 16–26 mm. Adults are on wing from June to September.

The larvae are aquatic and feed on Menyanthes, Lemna, eelgrass, Potamogeton and Cyperaceae species.

Subspecies
Elophila icciusalis albiplaga Munroe, 1972
Elophila icciusalis avalona Munroe, 1972
Elophila icciusalis icciusalis

External links
 Bug Guide
 Images

Acentropinae
Moths of North America
Aquatic insects
Moths described in 1859